Quelch is an English surname, with alternative spellings of Quelche, or QulchIt derived from the Old English nickname for a Celt or foreigner "woelisc", via Middle English "walsche", to Welch, Welsh or Wels(c)he. Notable people with the surname include:

Harry Quelch (1858–1913), one of the first Marxists in Britain
John Quelch (born 1951), British-American academic
John Quelch (pirate) (1666–1704), English pirate
Lorenzo Quelch (1862–1937), British trade unionist and politician, younger brother of Harry
Tom Quelch (1886–1954), socialist politician and son of Harry
Victor Quelch (1891–1975), Canadian farmer, soldier and politician

References

English-language surnames